Francavilla Marittima is a town and comune in the province of Cosenza in the Calabria region of southern Italy. It is known for the Timpone della Motta, a hill which was the site of an Oenotrian and ancient Greek settlement and sanctuary.

References 

Cities and towns in Calabria